Emil Otto Rasch (7 December 1891 – 1 November 1948) was a high-ranking German Nazi official and Holocaust perpetrator, who commanded Einsatzgruppe C in northern and central Ukraine until October 1941. After World War II, Rasch was indicted for war crimes at the Einsatzgruppen trial, but the case was discontinued for medical reasons in 1948. He died in the same year while still in custody.

Biography
Rasch was born in Friedrichsruh, Schleswig-Holstein. As a young man, Rasch fought in the First World War as a naval lieutenant. Following Germany's defeat, Rasch studied philosophy, law, political science, and received doctorates in law and political economy. With two university doctorates, Rasch was known as "Dr Dr Rasch", in accordance with German academic tradition. In 1931, Rasch became a private  sector lawyer, with a practice based in Dresden. In 1933, Rasch  became mayor of Radeberg,  followed shortly in 1935  by becoming lord mayor of Wittenberg.

Rasch joined the NSDAP on 1 October 1931 (membership №  620,976), and joined the SA in 1933 and the SS on 10 March 1933 (membership № 107,100). Beginning in 1936, Rasch was employed full-time by the Sicherheitsdienst (SD). On 1 October 1937, as commissioner, Rasch assumed leadership of the State Police (Stapo) in Frankfurt am Main. In March 1938, again as commissioner, Rasch became director of security (based in Linz) for Upper Austria. In June 1938, Rasch was assigned various responsibilities within the RSHA and was appointed chief of the Security Police (SiPo) and SD in Prague.

In November 1939, as inspector of the SiPo and SD, Rasch was transferred to Königsberg.  Rasch suggested and oversaw the liquidation of Polish political prisoners (intelligentsia) who had been arrested by the Einsatzgruppen. Rasch himself checked which prisoners were to be killed. Though the killings took place in forests, in an attempt at  causing panic, news of the executions was still known. With the approval of Reinhard Heydrich, Rasch organised and founded the Soldau concentration camp in the winter of 1939/40 as a Durchgangslager (Dulag), or transit camp, for deportations to the General Government, and where Polish intelligentsia could be secretly executed.

Einsatzgruppe
In June 1941, shortly before the invasion of the Soviet Union, Rasch took command of Einsatzgruppe C. In this capacity, he perpetrated extermination actions against Jews. Rasch, along with General Kurt Eberhard and Paul Blobel, organised the Babi Yar massacre, which saw the murder of over 33,000 Jews.

According to the post-war affidavit of Erwin Schulz, commander of Einsatzkommando 5 (part of Einsatzgruppe C):

Rasch made sure that all Einsatzgruppen personnel, including the commanding officers, personally shot Jews, so that all members were culpable.

In August 1941, Hitler is alleged (in post-war interrogations of German prisoners) to have given a Führerbefehl (Leader's Order) for the extermination of entire populations in the Eastern territories. The commando leaders subordinate to Rasch met with him to discuss this order. Paul Blobel later testified that Rasch basically quoted what had been stated by Friedrich Jeckeln, that "the measures against the Jewish population had to be sharper and that he disapproved of the manner in which they had been carried out until now because it was too mild". In other words, the order was to shoot more Jews. Erwin Schulz confirmed this:

Rasch was discharged from his position in October 1941, and at the beginning of 1942, he became the director of Continental Oil, Inc. in Berlin.

Rasch was indicted at the Einsatzgruppen trial at the end of September 1947 but the case against Rasch was discontinued on 5 February 1948 because he had Parkinson's disease and associated dementia. Otto Rasch died later that year on 1 November in Wehrstedt, Lower Saxony.

In fiction
Rasch appears in Jonathan Littell's novel Les Bienveillantes. He files a record that the military should concentrate on fighting bolshevism which should not be identified with Jews. He also gives the order that Jews should be paraded in public before executions to 'destroy in eyes of Ukrainian peasants the myth of Jewish power'.

References

Bibliography
 Christopher Browning (2004). The Origins of the Final Solution : The Evolution of Nazi Jewish Policy, September 1939 – March 1942 (With contributions by Jürgen Matthäus), Lincoln : University of Nebraska Press.
 Henry Friedlander (1995). The Origins of Nazi Genocide: From Euthanasia to the Final Solution. The University of North Carolina Press. 
 Richard Rhodes (2002). Masters of Death: The SS-Einsatzgruppen and the Invention of the Holocaust, New York: Alfred A. Knopf. 
 Zenter, Christian and Bedürftig, Friedemann (1991). Encyclopedia of the Third Reich, New York: Macmillan, p. 754. 

1891 births
1948 deaths
People from the Province of Schleswig-Holstein
Holocaust perpetrators in Poland
Nazis who died in prison custody
SS-Brigadeführer
Soldau concentration camp personnel
Holocaust perpetrators in Ukraine
Einsatzgruppen personnel
Sturmabteilung personnel
People indicted by the United States Nuremberg Military Tribunals
Gestapo personnel
Imperial German Navy personnel of World War I
Lawyers in the Nazi Party
Mayors of places in Saxony-Anhalt
Babi Yar
Neurological disease deaths in Germany
Deaths from Parkinson's disease
Prisoners who died in United States military detention